Abramidze is a Georgian surname. Notable people with the surname include:

 Pavle Abramidze (1901–1989), Soviet major-general
 Valeri Abramidze (born 1980), Georgian footballer

Georgian-language surnames